Martin Wait (1942–2012) was a British font designer and graphic designer. He was best known for his work for Letraset, which created dry transfer lettering used on advertising and other lettering projects.

Wait was born in Forest Gate in London and attended Lister Community School in Plaistow. Despite having dyslexia, he created custom lettering for advertising, including logos for Tetley's, the Radio Times, Fox's Glacier Mints and Alpen cereal. He later came to design fonts for Letraset and Monotype, often in the script typeface genre.

References

External links
 Personal website (archived from 2005)
 Lettering website (archived from 2010)

1942 births
2012 deaths
British typographers and type designers
English graphic designers